Habib Wahid is a Bangladeshi singer and composer. He has composed and performed songs for albums, singles, and film soundtracks. The following is a list of the songs recorded by Habib Wahid.

Studio albums

Solo albums

Moina Go (2004) 
Habib Wahid served as the composer and producer of the album while Julie, Ferdous Wahid, Nirjhor, Milon Mahmud & Konika featured as singers. This was Wahid's debut solo album, as well his debut as a vocalist, singing the songs "Din Gelo" and "Esho Brishti Namai (Raat Nirghum)".

Shono (2006) 
Habib Wahid served as the composer and producer of the album. Wahid also served as main vocalist, singing every song except "Calenderer Pata", which was sung by his father Ferdous Wahid.

Bolchhi Tomake (2008) 

All lyrics written by Susmita Biswas Sathi.

Ahoban! (2011) 

Habib Wahid composed the songs of the album, and produced the album alongside Sajid Sarker. The album included Nancy and Kona as featured artists, as well as Ferdous Wahid, who sang the song "O Mishti Meye".

Shadhin (2012) 

Habib Wahid serves as the composer, producer, and sole vocalist of this album.

Collaborative albums

Krishno (with Kaya) (2003) 

Habib Wahid served as the composer and producer of the album while Kaya sung the songs. This was Habib Wahid's debut album.

Maya (with Kaya & Helal) (2004) 

Habib Wahid served as the composer and producer of the album while Kaya and Helal sung the songs. Kunel was also featured artist on the album.

Panjabiwala (with Shireen) (2007) 

Habib Wahid served as the composer and producer of the album, while Shireen Jawad sung every song, except "Bole Toh Diyechi Hridoyer Kotha", which was sung by Habib Wahid featuring Nancy.

O Bosheshe (with Ferdous Wahid) (2008)

Shomorpon (with Aurthohin and Warfaze) (2011) 
This album was a tribute to Lalon, Hason Raja and Shah Abdul Karim.

Rong (with Nancy) (2012) 

Habib Wahid produced and composed the album while Nancy sung the songs, with the exception of "Jhora Pata", which was a duet between Habib Wahid and Nancy, and "Dubechi", which included Mithun as a featured artist.

Singles

Film soundtracks

As composer

As singer

Guest appearances

References

Wahid